Houda Echouafni is a Moroccan actress.
Houda Echouafni is a British/Arab actress her theatre work includes The RSC, The National Theatre and The Globe Theatre.
Houda began filming Penny Woolcock's The Death of Klinghoffer in Malta while she was still at Drama school. Other roles include Doctors, Waking the Dead and Hotel Babylon, Green Wing

Houda has Worked with the Royal Court, translating and acting in plays for their international season. This has resulted in one of her translations being published in the book Plays from the Arab World by Nick Hern Books.

Houda Echouafni  famously played Shahrazad in Tim Supples acclaimed 6 hour production of One Thousand and One Nights to critical acclaim the play was adapted by Hanan al-shyakh

Her TV work includes Mother Mary in the epic TV series Jesus: His Life for the History Channel

References

External links

Year of birth missing (living people)
Living people
English television actresses
English translators
English people of Egyptian descent
English people of Moroccan descent